Geodorcus philpotti is a large flightless species of stag beetle in the family Lucanidae. It was named by Major Thomas Broun after Mr A. Philpott, who discovered it at Hump Ridge near Invercargill. It is endemic to New Zealand.

Description
Including their large mandibles, male specimens range in length from 20.5 to 29 mm. Females range in length from 17.0–23.6 mm. They have a dull to slightly glossy exoskeleton. Their elytra have obvious ridges.

Distribution
This beetle is found in the south-west of the South Island from the coast adjoining the Hump Ridge Track in the south to 1400m above sea level in the regions' mountains. Its northernmost record is from the Grebe River, near Lake Manapouri.

Habitat
This species has been observed under Astelia plants and on vegetation at night.

References

External links 
 

Lucaninae
Beetles described in 1914
Beetles of New Zealand
Endemic fauna of New Zealand
Endemic insects of New Zealand